Princess Sara is a 1985 Japanese television series based on Frances Hodgson Burnett's 1905 children's novel, A Little Princess. The series was produced by Nippon Animation under the direction of Fumio Kurokawa, and its scriptwriter was Ryūzō Nakanishi. Princess Sara premiered on 6 January 1985 on Fuji Television. The 46-episode series was the 11th of Nippon Animation's World Masterpiece Theater.


Episodes

References

Lists of anime episodes